Shin Su-won (born 1967) is a South Korean film director and screenwriter. Shin wrote and directed Passerby #3 (2010), Pluto (2013) and Madonna (2015). Her short film Circle Line won the Canal+ Prize for Best Short Film at the 2012 Cannes Film Festival.

Early life
Shin Su-won studied German language education at Seoul National University, and after graduating, she worked as a middle school teacher in Seoul for 10 years, mostly teaching social studies subjects such as geography, world history and political economy. During this time, she also wrote two books focused on teens. Then in 2010, she enrolled at Korea National University of Arts initially because she wanted to become a novelist. But Shin fell in love with the cinema and filmmaking, and changed her major to screenwriting. At the age of 34, she decided to quit her teaching job and become a film director.

Career
Using  from her own pension, Shin had begun working on her feature directorial debut since 2007. The self-produced independent film Passerby #3, released in 2010, was derived from her own experiences as a thirty-something woman trying break into the industry and become a filmmaker. Passerby #3 won the JJ-Star Award at the 11th Jeonju International Film Festival and the Best Asian-Middle Eastern Film award at the 23rd Tokyo International Film Festival.

Her next project was the short film Circle Line, which tells the story of a middle-aged man killing time on a Seoul subway train as he tries to keep from his family the fact that he was recently laid off. Circle Line was invited to participate in the 65th Cannes Film Festival and won the Canal+ Prize for best short film. It screened in theaters as part of the four-film omnibus Modern Family.

Pluto, Shin's sophomore feature, was a 2012 thriller that explores the competitive nature of the Korean education system. It premiered at the 17th Busan International Film Festival, and Shin received a special mention at the Generation 14plus Section of the 63rd Berlin International Film Festival.

In 2015, her third feature Madonna, about a nurse's aide trying to secure an organ donation, was invited to screen in the Un Certain Regard section of the 68th Cannes Film Festival.

Filmography
Sweeter Than Candy (short film, 2002) - director, screenwriter
Shave (short film, 2003) - director, screenwriter, music director
Home Sweet Home (short film, 2004) - co-screenwriter
Passerby #3 (2010) - director, screenwriter, producer
Circle Line (short film, 2012) - director, screenwriter
Pluto (2013) - director, screenwriter
Madonna (2015) - director, screenwriter
Glass Garden (2017) - director, screenwriter

Awards
2010 11th Women in Film Korea Awards: Best Female Director/Screenwriter of the Year (Passerby #3)
2012 65th Cannes Film Festival: Canal+ Prize for Best Short Film (Circle Line)
2013 63rd Berlin International Film Festival: Special Mention from Youth Jury Generation 14plus (Pluto)
2016 3rd Wildflower Film Awards: Best Director (Narrative Films) (Madonna)

References

External links
Shin Su-won at Korean Film Biz Zone

South Korean film directors
South Korean women film directors
South Korean screenwriters
1967 births
Living people